This is a list of airports in Moldova, sorted by location.



Airport 

Airports shown in bold have scheduled passenger service on commercial airlines.

See also 

 Transport in Moldova
 List of airports by ICAO code: L#LU – Moldova
 Wikipedia:WikiProject Aviation/Airline destination lists: Europe#Moldova, Republic of

References 

 
 
  – includes IATA codes
  – IATA codes, ICAO codes and coordinates

External links
 Civil Aviation Administration of Moldova 
 Aeronautical Information Service, Republic of Moldova

 
Moldova
Airports
Airports
Moldova